Elinda Vorster (née Rademeyer; born 8 September 1965 in Cape Town) is a retired South African athlete who specialised in sprinting events. She represented her country at the 1992 Summer Olympics and the 1993 World Championships.

Her personal bests are 11.22 seconds in the 100 metres (+1.4 m/s, Germiston 1990) and 22.58 seconds in the 200 metres (+1.2 m/s, Germiston 1990).

Competition record

References

1965 births
Living people
Sportspeople from Cape Town
South African female sprinters
Athletes (track and field) at the 1992 Summer Olympics
Olympic athletes of South Africa
World Athletics Championships athletes for South Africa
Olympic female sprinters
20th-century South African women
21st-century South African women